Birštonas Municipality is one of 60 municipalities of Lithuania.

Mayors
Algirdas Radauskas (1987–1990)
 Antanas Zenkevičius (1990–1991)
 Jonas Aleknavičius (1991–1992)
 Algirdas Radauskas (1992–1994)
 Antanas Zenkevičius (1994–2007)
 Nijolė Dirginčienė (2007)
 Antanas Zenkevičius (2007–2008)
 Nijolė Dirginčienė (2008-present)

Elderships 
Birštonas Municipality is divided into two elderships:

References

Municipalities of Kaunas County
Municipalities of Lithuania